Opus is the debut studio album by Swedish DJ Eric Prydz. It was released on 5 February 2016 in Sweden through Virgin Records. The album includes the singles "Every Day", "Liberate", "Generate", "Opus", "Breathe" and "Last Dragon".

Singles
"Every Day" was released as the lead single from the album on 15 October 2012; the song has charted in Belgium and the Netherlands. "Liberate" was released as the second single from the album on 3 June 2014, the song has charted in Belgium. "Generate" was released as the third single from the album on 18 June 2015. "Opus" was released as the fourth single from the album on 17 August 2015, the song has charted in Belgium. "Breathe" was released as the fifth single from the album on 8 January 2016. "Last Dragon" was released as the sixth single from the album on 2 February 2016.

Critical reception

Opus received generally positive reviews from music critics. At Metacritic, which assigns a normalised rating out of 100 to reviews from mainstream critics, the album has an average score of 72 based on 5 reviews, indicating "generally favorable reviews". 

Spin ranked it number 76 among the best albums released during the decade of the 2010s, across all genres.

Track listing
Opus includes the following tracks. The CD version is split across two discs, with 10 tracks on the first (ending with "Eclipse"), and nine on the second (beginning with "Sunset at Café Mambo").

Charts

Release history

References

2016 debut albums
Eric Prydz albums